Aloka Chandra McLean (born December 21, 1981 in Halifax, Nova Scotia) is a Canadian actress. She is most noted for her role in the film The Lotus Eaters, for which she received a Genie Award nomination for Best Actress at the 14th Genie Awards in 1993. The Lotus Eaters was her first film role; around the same time, she had her first stage role playing Helen Keller in a Vancouver production of The Miracle Worker.

McLean also made guest appearances in the television series Neon Rider, The X-Files and Are You Afraid of the Dark?, and the television films Justice for Annie: A Moment of Truth Movie and Songs in Ordinary Time.

Awards and nominations

References

External links

1981 births
Living people
Actresses from Halifax, Nova Scotia
Canadian film actresses
Canadian stage actresses
Canadian television actresses